Optimus Clix was one of the triple play brands in Portugal of the telecommunication operator Optimus. Optimus Clix was a competitor of the dominant operator (Portugal Telecom) in the residential market as Internet, telephone and TV service provider. In 2014, it merged with ZON and was renamed NOS. ZON is the main competitor of the dominant operator (Portugal Telecom).

History
In 1999, the Portuguese fixed-line telephone market was set to be deregulated, ending the monopoly of Portugal Telecom, which prompted Sonaecom, then mainly a mobile phone operator through its brand Optimus, to enter that market. Clix was launched on October 27 of that year as a residential Internet Service Provider (ISP), together with sister brand Novis (fixed-line telephone service and business ISP). Both brands were supported on the merger of Sonae Redes de Dados (IT consultancy and network management) with IP Global, an ISP which had been acquired earlier in the same year. The initial service offer of Clix consisted of Freeserve-type free Internet access, collecting a proportion of the standard telephone line charges, by analog modem or ISDN, and an advertising-supported web portal. The launch slogan was "fazer clix custa nix" (a wordplay on "to click/Clix costs nothing").

On 7 September 2002 Clix launched an ADSL Internet access service, as Clix Turbo. That service was withdrawn on 20 January 2004 under allegations of anti-competitive practices by Portugal Telecom, the simultaneous supplier of the service and a competitor on its own. Sonaecom then entered a strategy of building its own alternative network, to be fully independent from Portugal Telecom.

On 6 March 2004 the Novis and Clix brands were repositioned. Clix became a residential brand, offering fixed-line phone services for the first time. The relaunch campaign was named Revolução das Flores (flower revolution, a reference to the Clix logo and to the Carnation Revolution). The Clix service offer consisted of a 1 Mbit/s Internet ADSL connection and a telephone service without line rental. It was initially available in some areas of Lisbon and Oporto.

In November 2004, Clix launched new telephone and ADSL Internet access services, with transfer rates of 2, 4, and 8 Mbit/s. On 13 April 2005 Clix launched a 16 Mbit/s ADSL2+ Internet access offer, upgraded to 20 Mbit/s in 2006. As of December 2006, after periodical changes, Clix supplied two offers: 12 and 24 Mbit/s.

In April 2006 Clix made a soft launch of the SmarTV (IPTV) service, offering Digital Television and Video on demand over the ADSL/ADSL2+ Internet access services, which by this date were available to 50% of the population of Portugal. In 2009 it was renamed Clix TV.

In September 2008 Clix launch Clix Fibra, an FTTH based service offering Internet (up to 100Mbit/s), telephone and IPTV services.

In January 2010 Clix was renamed Optimus Clix.

In February 2013 it merged with ZON and was renamed to NOS.

See also
 Internet in Portugal

External links
 Clix web portal
 Unofficial Clix users forum

Internet service providers of Portugal
Products introduced in 1999
Products and services discontinued in 2013
1999 establishments in Portugal
2013 disestablishments in Portugal